Fiat 615 was a model of Fiat light truck manufactured from 1951 to 1953 as a successor to the Fiat 1100ELR, with which was still built in parallel. Its cabin was the most Graned made by Fiat, and was inspired by the Model 640.

At first the model had a new petrol engine with 1395 cc and 29 kW (39 hp) at 3800 rpm to 1400 Fiat, and had a manual 4-speed transmission. A 1.5 ton truck was newly developed, which was offered from 1951 in a flatbed and chassis for special bodies. It was powered by the engine of the prior year featured Fiat 1400s. The engine was already in the car Fiat 1400 was just sufficient, and with the 3.1 tons it had real trouble. Once in motion, the Fiat 615 was indeed  fast, but with forced driving it had poor fuel efficiency. There was a reason that the 1100 Fiat ELR far built until 1954. The somewhat weaker beast of burden was, with its 1.1 liter and 28/30 PS (at 4400 rpm) a little lame, but it had fully loaded a ton to move less weight, so was more economical. With high pressure, therefore a suitable diesel engine was developed by Fiat: a swirl chamber engine (Ricardo System) based on the 1.9 liter engine for the "big" Fiat in 1900 and the new SUV Fiat Campagnola. (This engine was a hubvergrößerte variant of the 1400 engine.) The new diesel engine (type 305) was later also available in either sedan 1400 from 1952 in addition to the Fiat 615 N (N = Nafta = Diesel) and one year in Fiat Campagnola and Fiat. Although the experiment of the Fiat 615 built 1.9 L gasoline engine proved to be stronger and with faster drive spurt, confined themselves to the diesel, the Type 615 N. Only Steyr in Austria until 1958 offered the Fiat 615 as gasoline, as Steyr 260 with its own 50 hp 2 L  gasoline engine from the car Steyr 2000. The Fiat 615 N was a very modern vehicle that in Italy, initially had no competition. The export ran well at the beginning, missing, or half-hearted development left the Fiat 615 N (and especially its successor) over the years become increasingly rare even in Italy. In Zastava in Yugoslavia, the Fiat 615 was built with a petrol engine under license. It is unclear whether the successor (from about 1963, as Fiat 615 N1) only with the 1.9 liter petrol engine (such as 615 B) was built, with a diesel engine.

Other variants
In addition to the flatbed, other variants with special bodies were made at Zastava, i.e. Zastava 620B crew cab, as was common in other Eastern European car factories (IFA, Csepel, Star, etc.).

References

615
Zastava Automobiles
Panel trucks